The Museum of the Asturian People (Asturian: Muséu del Pueblu d'Asturies) is a museum in Gijón, Principality of Asturias, Spain.  It is an open-air artspace containing Asturian popular art installations, large ethnographic items, and three buildings:

Casa de los Valdes:  temporary exhibition space
Casa de los González de la Vega: site of the International Bagpipe Museum, including a collection of traditional Asturian musical instruments
The Asturian Pavilion from the 1992 Universal Exposition of Seville, installed at the museum in 1994

References 

Gijón
Museums in Asturias
Asturian
Museums established in 1968